Dosan Seowon (alternatively, Tosansowon) was established in 1574 in what is present day Andong, South Korea, in memory of and four years after the death of Korean Confucian scholar Yi Hwang by some of his disciples and other Korean Confucian authorities. Yi Hwang had retired to the location in 1549 and begun construction on the facility, a private Korean Confucian academy offering instruction in the classics and honouring the sages with regular memorial rites.

Like other Korean Confucian academies, Dosan Seowon serves two purposes: education and commemoration.  The site was well known in Korea as one of the leading academies and was home to the Toegye School of Thought for over 400 years.  Although the educational function of the facility has long since ceased, the commemorative ceremonies have been and are still held twice a year.

The ancient academy received a royal charter in 1575 by King Seonjo and was featured on the reverse of the South Korean 1,000 won bill from 1975 to 2007 (BOK Series Designation Series II (나) 1983–2002).

Construction

The Dosan Seowon complex consists of "Dosan Seodang" (lecture hall), which Toegye built and where he taught his students and where a tablet reading "Dosan Seowon", that was a gift from King Seonjo, still hangs, "Nongun Jeongsa," (dormitory for the students), and "Jeongyodang," (square lotus pond). 

Dosan Seodang is composed of three parts; an exposed floor, a large room, and a kitchen. As Toegye was not wealthy, it took him four years to complete the construction of this building. A small signboard reading "Dosan Seowon", whose calligraphy Toegye he himself wrote, still hangings on one of the pillars at the end of Dosan Seodang.

Looking carefully at the Dosan Seodang floor, you will see an extension made of wooden planks. One of Toegye’s students, Jeonggu, recommended that Toegye extend the building's floor to accommodate more students. But although Toegye turned down Jeonggu's recommendation, Jeonggu and his fellow students hastily attached wooden planks to the floor while Toegye was out. Consequently, this part of the floor is not very elegant in construction and appearance (see Gallery photo below).

The garden is small but Toegye dug a small square pond called "Jeongudang" in the eastern part of the compound where he raised lotus flowers, and planted apricot trees in the western part. Toegye used to call apricots, bamboos, chrysanthemums, and pine trees his "friends", but he loved apricot trees most.

Gallery

See also
List of seowon
Korean Confucianism
Yi Hwang
Won
Tourism in South Korea

References

Tosansowon, South Korean Historic Site No. 170 Plaque, on site at Dosan Seowon, October 1, 2000.

External links

Seowon
Andong
1574 establishments in Asia
Buildings and structures in North Gyeongsang Province
Tourist attractions in North Gyeongsang Province
16th-century establishments in Korea